Joseph James Knott (2 April 1907 – 12 June 1989) was an Australian rules footballer who played with Footscray and North Melbourne in the Victorian Football League (VFL).

Notes

External links 

Joe Knott's playing statistics from The VFA Project

1907 births
1989 deaths
Australian rules footballers from Melbourne
Western Bulldogs players
North Melbourne Football Club players
Yarraville Football Club players
Brunswick Football Club players
Coburg Football Club players
People from Footscray, Victoria